Masque is the fifth regular studio album by The Mission which was released in June 1992 on the Vertigo sub-label of Mercury Records. Peaking at #23 in the UK albums chart, it failed to repeat the commercial success of the previous two official studio albums and marked the beginning of The Mission's decline in popularity; it was also the band's last album to achieve a UK top 40 position, until the release of  Another Fall From Grace in September 2016. Masque included the singles "Never Again" (UK #34), "Like a Child Again" (#UK 30) and "Shades of Green Pt. 2". The album included a number of outside collaborators, including Martin Allcock, Anthony Thistlethwaite and Miles Hunt.

The album was reissued in February 2008. The expanded release had four bonus tracks including the cover of Blondie's "Atomic" recorded for the NME's Ruby Trax compilation, released in November 1992.

Track listing
Except where noted, music by Adams, Brown, Hussey
All words by Hussey

1992 release
 "Never Again" – 5:05
 "Shades of Green, Pt. 2" – 3:59
 "Even You May Shine" (Adams, Brown, Hussey, Thistlethwaite) – 4:41
 "Trail of Scarlet" – 3:43
 "Spider and the Fly" – 4:49
 "She Conjures Me Wings"  (Adams, Brown, Hussey, Thistlethwaite)– 2:48
 "Sticks and Stones" – 4:45
 "Like a Child Again" – 3:38
 "Who Will Love Me Tomorrow?"  (Miles Hunt, Hussey) – 4:09
 "You Make Me Breathe" – 4:36
 "From One Jesus to Another" – 3:50
 "Until There's Another Sunrise" – 5:33

2008 re-issue
 "Never Again" – 5:05
 "Shades of Green, Pt. 2" – 3:59
 "Even You May Shine" – 4:41
 "Trail of Scarlet" – 3:43
 "Spider and the Fly" – 4:49
 "She Conjures Me Wings" – 2:48
 "Sticks and Stones" – 4:45
 "Like a Child Again" – 3:38
 "Who Will Love Me Tomorrow?" – 4:09
 "You Make Me Breathe" – 4:36
 "From One Jesus to Another" – 3:50
 "Until There's Another Sunrise" – 5:33
Bonus tracks
 "Beautiful Chaos" - 5:04
 "All Tangled Up In You" - 6:27
 "Atomic" (Debbie Harry, Jimmy Destri) - 5:13
 "You Make Me Breathe (The Barn Mix)" - 7:18

Personnel 
The Mission
 Craig Adams – bass guitar
 Mick Brown – drums
 Wayne Hussey – vocals & guitar
Additional musicians (from liner notes)
 Mark Saunders
 Joe Gibb
 Anto Thistlethwaite
 Martin Alcock
 Adam Birch
 Kelly Hussey
 Bev Perrin
 Penny Thompson
 B.J. De Haan
 Ric Saunders
 Arabic orchestration on "Sticks and Stones" scored, arranged and conducted by Jaz Coleman, performed by Aboud Abdel Ali

References

Sources

1992 albums
The Mission (band) albums
Albums produced by Mark Saunders (record producer)
Mercury Records albums